Geoff Masters was the defending champion but lost in the second round to Tony Roche.

Jimmy Connors won in the final 7–5, 6–4, 6–2 against Ken Rosewall.

Seeds

Draw

Section 1

Section 2

External links
 1977 Custom Credit Australian Indoor Championships Draw

Singles